C. europaeus may refer to:
 Capitonides europaeus, an extinct bird species from the Middle Miocene of southern Germany
 Caprimulgus europaeus, the European nightjar, a bird species found in most of Europe and temperate Asia

See also